Bread and Roses is the eleventh studio album by American singer and songwriter Judy Collins, released by Elektra Records in 1976. The album peaked at No. 25 on the Billboard Pop Albums charts.

Merging the singer's political convictions with the commercial success of the previous year's Judith,  political statements like the title song, originally a poem by James Oppenheim commonly associated with a 1912 garment workers strike in Lawrence, Massachusetts, were balanced with such pop compositions as Elton John's "Come Down in Time".

Released as the single from the album was "Special Delivery" by Billy Mernit. Luther Vandross sang background on this album, one of his earliest commercially recorded vocal performances.

Track listing
 "Bread and Roses" (Mimi Fariña, James Oppenheim) – 3:05
 "Everything Must Change" (Benard Ighner) – 4:25
 "Special Delivery" (Billy Mernit) – 3:55
 "Out of Control" (Judy Collins) – 3:00
 "Plegaria a un Labrador (Prayer to a Laborer)"  (Víctor Jara) – 4:04
 "Come Down in Time" (Elton John, Bernie Taupin) – 3:23
 "Spanish Is the Loving Tongue" (Charles Badger Clark, Billy Simon) – 4:32
 "I Didn't Know About You" (Duke Ellington, Bob Russell) – 3:29
 "Take This Longing" (Leonard Cohen) – 5:25
 "Love Hurts" (Andrew Gold) – 3:17
 "Marjorie" (Judy Collins) – 0:43
 "King David" (Walter De La Mare, Herbert Howells) – 4:27

Personnel 
Judy Collins - Guitar, Keyboards, Vocals
 Gloria Agostini – Harp
 Rubens Bassini – Percussion
 Sy Berger – Trombone
 Jay Berliner – Guitar
 Kenneth Bichel – Synthesizer
 Don Brooks – Harmonica
 Robin Clark – Vocals
 Dom Cortese – Accordion
 Richard Davis – Bass
 Erin Dickins – Vocals
 Mark Doyle – Guitar
 Steve Gadd – Drums
 Mickey Gravine – Trombone
 Urbie Green – Trombone
 Corky Hale – Harmonica
 Hank Jones – Piano
 Gail Kantor – Vocals
 Tony Levin – Bass
 George Marge – Horn
 Charles McCracken – Cello
 Hugh McCracken – Guitar
 Merle Miller – Vocals
 Andy Pratt – Piano
 David Sanborn – Saxophone
 Les Scott – Wind
 Alan Shulman – Steel Guitar 
 Billy Slapin – Flute
 G. Diane Sumler – Vocals
 Luther Vandross – Vocals
Technical
Godfrey Diamond - engineer
Phil Ramone - recording supervisor
Glen Christensen - art direction
Mary Ellen Mark - photography

References

1976 albums
Judy Collins albums
Albums produced by Arif Mardin
Elektra Records albums